Anyway may refer to:

 Anyway (album) or the title song, by Family, 1970
 Anyway Records, an American record label
 "Anyway" (CeeLo Green song), 2011
 "Anyway" (Chris Brown song), 2015
 "Anyway" (Duck Sauce song), 2009
 "Anyway" (George Hamilton IV song), 1971
 "Anyway" (Martina McBride song), 2006
 "Anyway", by Genesis from The Lamb Lies Down on Broadway, 1975
 "Anyway", by Honeycrack, 1996
 "Anyway", by Journey from Look into the Future, 1976
 "Anyway", by Paul McCartney from Chaos and Creation in the Backyard, 2005
 "Anyway", by Rebecca Black, 2019
 "Anyway", by Steve Perry from For the Love of Strange Medicine, 1994
 "Anyway", by Telepopmusik from Angel Milk, 2005
 "Anyway", by Vixen from Live & Learn, 2006
 "Anyway", by White Town from Peek & Poke, 2000

See also 
 Anyway Gang, a Canadian alternative rock supergroup
 Anyways (disambiguation)